Alvin may refer to:

Places

Canada
Alvin, British Columbia

United States
Alvin, Colorado
Alvin, Georgia
Alvin, Illinois
Alvin, Michigan
Alvin, Texas
Alvin, Wisconsin, a town
Alvin (community), Wisconsin, an unincorporated community

Other uses
 Alvin (given name)
 Alvin (crater), a crater on Mars
 Alvin (digital cultural heritage platform), a Swedish platform for digitised cultural heritage
 Alvin (horse), a Canadian Standardbred racehorse
 13677 Alvin, an asteroid
 DSV Alvin, a deep-submergence vehicle
 Alvin, a fictional planet on ALF (TV series)
 Alvin Seville, of the fictional animated characters Alvin and the Chipmunks
 "Alvin", by James from the album Girl at the End of the World
 Tropical Storm Alvin

See also
 Alvin Community College 
 Alvin High School 
 Aylwin (disambiguation)